Tava lokam was one among the Seven Logas (Seven Upper Worlds) in Ayyavazhi mythology.

Ayyavazhi mythology